Gonatodes is a genus of New World dwarf geckos of the family Sphaerodactylidae.

Description

Diet
The diets of the various species of Gonatodes are composed mainly of very small arthropods.

Reproduction
Clutch size is one, with most species producing several clutches per year, and some utilizing communal egg-laying sites.

Habitat
Most species are humid tropical forest dwelling (some in warm lowlands, and others in somewhat cooler montane regions), with relatively fewer species utilizing more open, drier habitats at forest edge, tropical dry seasonal forest and scrub forest. Some species (usually those that use drier natural habitats) are able to utilize even more open human modified environments; in some cases including highly urbanized areas. Gonatodes usually spend most of their active hours perched anywhere from ground level to about 0.6 metres (2 feet) above ground, sometimes up to 2 or 3 metres (6.6 or 9.8 feet), on vertical or near vertical surfaces of tree trunks, tree stumps, logs and sometimes rocks (as well as on walls and house-posts for those that are able to use human altered environments). They seldom sit exposed to direct strong sunlight (they do not appear to bask), and most seem to prefer shade or less exposure to direct sun light.

Geographic range
Species of Gonatodes are found in Central America including southern Mexico, a few Caribbean Islands (including Cuba, Hispaniola, Jamaica and Union Island in St. Vincent and the Grenadines) and the northern part of South America, including Peru, Colombia, Ecuador, Bolivia, Guyana, French Guiana, Suriname, parts of Brazil, Venezuela, the islands of Trinidad and Tobago, and some of the small islands just off the cost of northern South America.

Introduced species
Human mediated introductions have occurred with Gonatodes caudiscutatus in the Galapagos Islands and G. albogularis in Florida. In addition, some species have been transplanted by human activity to various regions within the general range of the genus where the particular species did not previously exist.

Species
The following 34 species are recognized as being valid. Some subspecies are also listed.
Gonatodes albogularis (A.M.C. Duméril & Bibron, 1836) – white-throated clawed gecko, white-throated gecko, yellow-headed gecko
Gonatodes albogularis albogularis (A.M.C. Duméril & Bibron, 1836)
Gonatodes albogularis bodinii Rivero-Blanco, 1968
Gonatodes albogularis notatus (J.T. Reinhardt & Lütken, 1862)
Gonatodes alexandermendesi Cole & Kok, 2006 
Gonatodes annularis Boulenger, 1887 – annulated gecko
Gonatodes antillensis (Lidth de Jeude, 1887) – Antilles gecko, Venezuelan coastal clawed gecko
Gonatodes astralis Schargel et al., 2010
Gonatodes atricucullaris Noble, 1921 – Cajamarca gecko
Gonatodes castanae Carvajal-Cogollo, Eguis-Avendaño & Meza-Joya, 2020 – Castaño’s Gecko
Gonatodes caudiscutatus (Günther, 1859) – shieldhead gecko
Gonatodes ceciliae Donoso-Barros, 1966 – brilliant clawed gecko, brilliant South American gecko
Gonatodes chucuri Meneses-Pelayo & Ramírez, 2020 – Chucuri gecko
Gonatodes concinnatus (O'Shaughnessy, 1881) – O'Shaughnessy's gecko
Gonatodes daudini Powell & Henderson, 2005 – Grenadines clawed gecko, Union Island clawed gecko, Union Island gecko
Gonatodes eladioi Nascimento, Ávila-Pires & Cunha, 1987 – South American gecko
Gonatodes falconensis Shreve, 1947 – Estado Falcón gecko
Gonatodes hasemani Griffin, 1917 – Haseman's gecko
Gonatodes humeralis (Guichenot, 1855) – South American clawed gecko, Trinidad gecko
Gonatodes infernalis Rivas & Schargel, 2008
Gonatodes lichenosus Rojas-Runjaic et al., 2010 - Perijá lichen gecko
Gonatodes ligiae Donoso-Barros, 1967
Gonatodes machelae Rivero-Blanco & Schargel, 2020
Gonatodes nascimentoi Sturaro & Ávila-Pires, 2011
Gonatodes naufragus Rivas et al., 2013 – La Blanquilla clawed gecko
Gonatodes ocellatus (Gray, 1831) – eyespot clawed gecko, eyespot gecko, ocellated gecko
Gonatodes petersi Donoso-Barros, 1967 – Peters' gecko
Gonatodes purpurogularis Esqueda, 2004
Gonatodes rayito Schargel, Rivas, García-Pérez, Rivero-Blanco, Chippindale & Fujita, 2017
Gonatodes riveroi Sturaro & Ávila-Pires, 2011
Gonatodes rozei Rivero-Blanco & Schargel, 2012 - Roze's gecko
Gonatodes seigliei Donoso-Barros, 1966 – Estado Sucre gecko
Gonatodes superciliaris Barrio-Amorós & Brewer-Carías, 2008 - Sarisariñama forest gecko
Gonatodes taniae Roze, 1963 – Estado Aragua gecko, ring-necked clawed gecko
Gonatodes tapajonicus Rodrigues, 1980 – Pará gecko
Gonatodes timidus Kok, 2011
Gonatodes vittatus (Lichtenstein, 1856) – striped clawed gecko, Wiegmann's striped gecko

Nota bene: A binomial authority or trinomial authority in parentheses indicates that the species or subspecies was originally described in a genus other than Gonatodes.

References

Further reading
Fitzinger L (1843). Systema Reptilium, Fasciculus Primus, Amblyglossae. Vienna: Braumüller & Seidel. 106 pp. + indices. (Gonatodes, new genus, pp. 18, 90-91). (in Latin).

 
Vertebrates of Guyana
Lizard genera
Taxa named by Leopold Fitzinger